

Brief 

The Hero Honda Achiever is a 149.1 cc motorcycle manufactured in India by Hero Honda. The Achiever production started in 2006. It is based and shares Chassis and body parts of Hero Honda Ambition 135 platform.

Hero Honda Achiever (BS3) 
The Hero Honda Achiever engine is the same 149.1 cc Honda Unicorn engine, with a minuscule difference in power and equipped with Advanced Microprocessor Ignition System (AMI), Which was first introduced by Hero Honda in Hero Honda Ambition 135 Motorcycle. This Bike Equipped with Keihin Conventional CV Carburetor and Complies (BS3) emission norms Bharat stage emission standards . Production of this bike started in early 2006 but totally stopped in 2010 due to low sales.

Hero Achiever (BS3) 
Hero Honda restarted the production of the model as named Hero Achiever in 2011 due to the separation of Hero Honda joint venture in 2010, with some graphic variations & also sporting a black alloy wheel along with the same 149.1 cc engine and Complies (BS3) emission norms Bharat stage emission standards with new ATFT technology. Still Achiever struggles to compete the sales in market. Finally Hero Achiever discontinued in 2015.

Hero Achiever 150 (BS4) 

Despite this, it was never a big hit in the market due to the increasing competition in the Indian market of 150 cc bikes. The Achiever was eventually deemed a failure and production ceased in 2019.

Related 
Hero Honda CBZ 
Hero Honda Karizma
Hero Honda Karizma R
Hero Honda Karizma ZMR
Hero Honda Ambition 135
Hero Honda Splendor
Hero Honda Passion
Hero Honda Super Splendor
Hero Honda Hunk
Honda Unicorn
Honda Shine
Hero Pleasure
Honda Activa

Reference

 
 
 
 
 

 

 

 

 

 

 

 

 

 

 

 

Ambition
Motorcycles introduced in 1999

Achiever
Motorcycles introduced in 2006